Regis F. Groff (April 8, 1935 – October 5, 2014) was an American school teacher, politician, and civil servant. The second African-American elected to the Colorado State Senate, Groff would serve in that body for a total of 20 years. Noted for his public speaking ability, he was called the "Conscience of the Colorado Senate."

Biography

Early years

Regis F. Groff was born in Monmouth, Illinois on April 8, 1935. Groff served a stint in the United States Air Force from 1953 to 1957 as part of the Northeast Air Command.

Groff attended Western Illinois University, from which he graduated in 1962. Following graduation Groff worked for one year in the city of Chicago as a case worker for the Cook County Department of Public Aid.

Groff moved to Denver, Colorado in 1963 to take a position teaching history at Smiley Junior High School in that city. In 1967 he moved over to East High School, where he taught history and government. While a teacher at East High Groff would return to school at the University of Denver, from which he received a Master's degree in Education in 1972.

Political career

Groff initial stint in the Colorado State Senate in 1974 came via a special election held to fill two remaining years of a term for a seat vacated by Lieutenant Governor George L. Brown, the first African-American to have been elected to that body. Groff thereby became the second black elected to that body. Groff was re-elected to a full term in 1976 and returned to the statehouse at each election up to his departure from the Colorado Senate.

In 1976 Groff was selected by his Democratic peers as Assistant Minority Leader in the Colorado Senate. He was chosen by the Democratic caucus as Senate Minority Leader in the sessions held in 1978 and 1980.

During his time in the Colorado Senate Groff was instrumental in winning passage of legislation making the federal Martin Luther King Jr. Day into an official state holiday. He also worked actively in efforts to force the state to divest from investments in companies dealing with the Republic of South Africa, then ruled by a white minority government on the basis of racial apartheid. Groff traveled to South Africa, China, and a number of other countries in Europe and Africa on fact-finding missions and advancing the economic business of the state.

In 1986 Groff unsuccessfully ran for statewide office in an effort to become Lieutenant Governor of Colorado.

Later years

Groff resigned his seat the Colorado Senate in the first half of 1994 when Governor Roy Romer named him as the state's first director of the Youthful Offender System in Denver. He was succeeded by Gloria Tanner, whose appointment made her the first African American woman to serve as a Colorado state senator. Shortly thereafter, Groff resigned his position as the president of the National Black Caucus of State Legislators, a position he had held for four years.

Groff retired from state service in 1998, moving to the position of Executive Director of the Metro Black Church Initiative, a religious community service organization.

Death and legacy

Regis Groff died on October 5, 2014. He was 79 years old at the time of his death.

Groff was remember by Denver Mayor Michael B. Hancock as a "truly great leader" who was in turns "a friend, a mentor, and an adviser" who reminded him of the need of elected officials "to stay focused on the community, to always put the needs of the people before politics."

Groff's papers are housed by the Denver Public Library in Denver, Colorado. The collection consists of 8 archival boxes and 5 other containers of material, of which all save one are open for public research. The single restricted box remains closed until 2030.

Groff's son, Peter Groff, later served the same district as a member of the Colorado State Senate. His daughter, Traci L. (Groff) Jones is a published and nationally award Young Adult Author of three published books. He also has a campus named after him in northeast Denver Colorado. The Regis F. Groff campus, currently is a shared high school campus which houses KIPP High school and Strive Prep High School.

References

Works

 Dan Price (moderator), School Desegregation: A Black Perspective. With Rachel Noel. Racine, WI: Johnson Foundation, 1976. —Audio cassette.
 Afro-American Health issues in the 1990s: Interviews with Participants at the 14th Annual Meeting of the National Black Caucus of State Legislators, St. Thomas, Virgin Islands. (Contributor.) Washington, DC: National Black Caucus of State Legislators, n.d. [c. 1990]. —Audio cassette.

Further reading

 George Derek Musgrove, Rumor, Repression, and Racial Politics: How the Harassment of Black Elected Officials Shaped Post-Civil Rights America. Athens, GA: University of Georgia Press, 2012.
 Wellington E. Webb with Cindy Brovsky, Wellington Webb: The Man, the Mayor, and the Making of Modern Denver: An Autobiography. Golden, CO: Fulcrum Publishing, 2007.

External links
 Tammi E. Haddad and Merrie Jo Schroeder, Regis Groff Papers: Finding Aid, Blair-Caldwell African American Research Library, Denver Public Library, 2006.

1935 births
2014 deaths
People from Monmouth, Illinois
Educators from Colorado
Colorado state senators
Place of death missing
Western Illinois University alumni
University of Denver alumni
African-American state legislators in Colorado
Educators from Illinois
20th-century African-American people
21st-century African-American people